Tokyoite is a rare barium manganese vanadate mineral with the chemical formula: Ba2(Mn3+,Fe3+)OH(VO4)2. It is the manganese analogue of the iron rich gamagarite and the barium analogue of the lead vanadate, brackebuschite.

It occurs in low-grade metamorphosed sedimentary manganese ore deposits associated with hyalophane, braunite and tamaite.

It was first reported for an occurrence in the Shiromaru Mine, Okutama, Tama district, Tokyo Prefecture, Kantō region, Honshu Island, Japan and approved by the IMA in 2003. It has been found in two mines in Italy and one in Japan, for which it was named.

References

Vanadate minerals
Monoclinic minerals